Nicole Hahn Rafter (1939–2016; English pronunciation: ni-kohl h-ah-n raf-ter) was a feminist criminology professor at Northeastern University. She received her Bachelor of Arts degree from Swarthmore College in Pennsylvania, achieved her Master of Arts in Teaching from Harvard University, and obtained a Ph.D. in Criminal Justice from State University of New York in Albany. She began her career as a high school and college English professor and switched to criminal justice in her mid-thirties.

In 1977, Rafter began teaching at Northeastern University's College of Criminal Justice in Boston, Massachusetts. There she developed one of the country's first courses on women and crime as well as a course on crime films. In 1999, she resigned her position as a full-time professor to focus on her writing projects. She continued affiliation with Northeastern University as an adjunct professor overseeing dissertation students, but not teaching regular courses. In 2002 she resumed teaching at the College of Criminal Justice with a graduate course in Biological Theories of Crime.

During the 1980s, Rafter began publishing her writings mainly focusing on the female prison system. She argued there have always been differences between the prison systems of the different sexes. She also asserted that academia has focused little on women since the majority of studies were done on male institutions by male writers. She wrote about the history of prisons for women, noting the differences between them and commenting on the effects that gender has on institutions.

In 1988, Rafter published White Trash: the Eugenic Family Studies 1877-1919, writing about the eugenic movement in the United States and the way in which the poor were shaped as inferior through heredity. At the beginning of the 1990s, Rafter accounted for gender in the eugenic movement in the United States, showing how women were negatively affected with biological notions of being carriers of disease through reproduction.

Intellectual history
Rafter achieved a Ph.D. in Criminal Justice from State University of New York, Albany, which sparked her academic career in feminist criminology. Thereafter, she began writing about delinquent individuals. Her first publication on this topic was in 1969, with her first group of writings was released throughout the 1980s.

Rafter began researching and creating arguments for the feminist cause after her book White Trash: the Eugenic Family Studies 1877-1919. This led to her 1997 course at Northeastern University entitled Gender, Representation, and Social Control. This served to teach criminology students knowledge of the workings of prison institutions and their reciprocal influences.

In the 2000s she began focusing on the representation of crime films in mass media and culture. She explored this in her 2006 paper Shots in the Mirror: Crime Films and Society. At the same time, she began research into the biological theories of crime. In 2004 she wrote Earnest A. Hooton and the Biological Tradition in American Criminology, examining the historical importance of Earnest Hooton’s theories of biological explanations of crime while crediting Hooton with building a history for criminology. She also wrote an introduction for Cesare Lombroso’s Criminal Women in 2004.

In the first decade of the 21st century, Rafter published three works relating to crime films and criminology. These works include Badfellas: Movie Psychos, Popular Culture, and Law, Shots in the Mirror: Crime Films and Society, and Crime, Film, and Criminology: Recent Sex Crime Movies. In 2008 she published  The Criminal Brain: Understanding Biological Theories of Crime.

Contributions to feminist criminology
Rafter contributed extensively to feminist criminology through her historical research of female prison systems, crime films and their social understandings of sex and crime being their reason for gendering. Her work has influenced the ways in which biological crime theorists have studied women. Her work of gender and justice has evolved with feminist criminological thinking.

Rafter contributed to feminist criminology through her research and literature on the female prison system starting in 1975. She wrote her last contribution in 1999. Arguing that research and writing at the time only focused on men and was written by men, Rafter led the way in documenting historical gender relations in prisons using, for example, the New York State Prison for Women at Auburn. Another early article Rafter published in 1985 which has been cited six times claims that women in state prisons from 1800-1935 were only given partial justice documenting the differences and the emphasis given to male prison systems. Rafter’s work on female prison systems occurred during the time when feminism was becoming a focal point in critical criminology.

Rafter’s contributions to feminist criminology at Northeastern University in particular included her creating the syllabus for one of the first courses on women and crime and crime films. Rafter’s Shots in the Mirror: Crime Films and Society has been cited a total of twenty-one times which is indicative of her influence. Rafter's syllabus elaborates on how our depiction of on-screen crime in movies actually forms our understanding of everyday crime within society.  She argues within this book that crime films produce social hierarchies within crime that are reproduced in everyday life. Depicting, for example, the sexualized female character and the villainous man. Therefore, Rafter greatly contributed to the literature on crime films and their reproduction in everyday crime.

Recognition

Northeastern University recognizes one of Rafter’s areas of expertise as biological theories of crime. Her historical account of eugenic family studies published in 1988 and, more recently, her book on the biological theories and writings of Earnest A. Hooton, have both been cited five times. Allegedly, Rafter’s most influential contribution to feminist criminology was her re-translation and resource guide to Cesare Lombroso’s La Donna Delinquente in which she reinterprets women as being inferior and argues, therefore, their committing crimes at a lower level than male offenders. Rafter has shown a large interest in the history of biological theories of crime and her translation of Criminal Woman persuades advances in further research of the history of criminology specifically surrounding crime and women.

Honors and awards
 2009–2010 Fulbright Fellow Austria
 2009 Edwin H. Sutherland award from the American Society of Criminology
 2009 Allen Austin Bartolemew award for Best Paper for Criminology's Darkest Hour: Biocriminology in Nazi Germany
 1999 Distinguished Scholar Award, Division on Women and Crime, American Society of Criminology
 1999 American Association on Intellectual and Developmental Disabilities, Hervey B. Wilbur Historic Preservation Award
 1998 Distinguished Alumni Award, State University of New York at Albany (School of Criminal Justice)

Bibliography
 Rafter (1969). How to Teach a Delinquent.  Atlantic Monthly (March): 66-72.
 Rafter & Christianson, Scott. (1975) New York's Second Felony Law. New  York Times.
 Rafter (1978). Crime and Intelligence: A Historical Look at the Low IQ Theory. In James A. Inciardi and Kenneth C. Hass (Eds.), Crime and the Criminal  Justice Process. (67-74). Kendall/Hunt.
 Rafter (1980a). Female State Prisoners in Tennessee: 1831-1979. Tennessee Historical Quarterly 39: 485-497.
 Rafter (1980b). Too Dumb to Know Better: Cacogenic Family Studies and the Criminology of Women. Criminology 18: 3-25.
 Rafter (1980c). Matrons and Molls: The Study of Women's Prison History. In James A. Inciardi and Charles E. Faupel, (Eds.), History and Crime: Implications for Criminal Justice Policy (261-270). Beverly Hills: Sage.
 Rafter & Natalizia, Elena. (1981). Marxian Feminism: Implications for Criminal Justice Policy. Crime and Delinquency 27: 81-98.
 Rafter & Baunach J. Phyllis. (1982a). Sex Role Operations: Strategies for Women Working in the Criminal Justice System. In Judge, Lawyer, Victim, Thief:  Women, Gender Roles, and Criminal Justice (Ch. 13). Boston: Northeastern  University Press.
 Rafter & Stanko, A. Elizabeth. (1982b). Judge, Lawyer, Victim, Thief: Women, Gender Roles, and Criminal Justice. Boston: Northeastern University Press.
 Rafter (1982c). Hard Times: The Evolution of the Women's Prison System and the Example of the New York State Prison for Women at Auburn, 1893-1933. In Rafter and Stanko, (Eds.), Judge, Lawyer, Victim, Thief: Women, Gender Roles, and Criminal Justice (Ch. 11). Boston: Northeastern University Press.
 Rafter (1983a). Chastising the Unchaste: Social Control Functions of the Women's Reformatory System. In Stan Cohen and Andrew Scull, (Eds.), Social Control and the State (288-311). Oxford: Martin Robertson.
 Rafter (1983b). Prisons for Women, 1790-1980. In Michael H. Tonry and Norval Morris, (Eds.), Crime and Justice: An Annual Review of Research, Vol. 5.  Chicago: University of Chicago.
 Rafter (1985a). Cathy Webb: Why She Would Lie in the Dotson Case. The Patriot Ledger (Quincy, Mass) 29.
 Rafter (1985b). Gender, Prisons, and Prison History. Social Science History 9: 233-247.
 Rafter (1985c). Partial Justice: Women in State Prisons, 1800-1935. Boston, MA: Northeastern University Press.
 Rafter (1985d). Women: Second-Class Inmates. Chicago Tribune (19).
 Rafter (1986). Left Out By the Left: Crime and Crime Control. Socialist Review 89: 7-23.
 Rafter (1987). Even in Prison, Women and Second-class Citizens. Human Rights I14: 29-31,51.
 Rafter (1988a). White Trash as Social Ideology. Transaction/ Society 26: 43-49.
 Rafter (1988b). White Trash: The Eugenic Family Studies, 1877-1919. Boston, MA: Northeastern University Press.
 Rafter; Williamson, G. Susan, & Cohen-Rose, Amy. (1989a). Everyone Wins: A Collaborative Model for Mainstreaming Women’s Studies. Journal of Academic Librarianship 15:20-23.
 Rafter (1989b).  Crime and the Family. Socialist Review 19: 123-129.
 Rafter (1989c). Gender and Justice: The Equal Protection Issue. In Lynne Goodstein and Doris Mackenzie, (Eds.), The American Prison: Issues in Research and Policy (89-109). New York: Plenum Press.
 Rafter (1989d). Prisons, Women Inmates In. In Helen Tierney, (Ed.), Women’s Studies Encyclopedia, Vol. 1 (288-290). New York: Greenwood Press.
 Rafter (1990a). Crime and the Family. Women and Criminal Justice 1:73-86.
 Rafter (1990b). Equal Protection Forcing Changes in Women’s Prisons. Correction Law Reporter 2: 49, 51-52.
 Rafter (1990c). Partial Justice: Women, Prisons, and Social Control (2nd Ed). New Brunswick, NJ: Transaction Publishers.
 Rafter (1990d). The Social Construction of Crime and Crime Control. Journal of Research in Crime and Delinquency 27: 376-389.
 Rafter (1991a). Equal Treatment or Different Treatment?  The Origins of Today's Policy Dilemmas in the Care of Incarcerated Women. U.S. Department of  Justice, Federal Bureau of Prisons, Female Offenders.  The June 7, 1991 Forum on Issues in Corrections. Washington, D.C.: Federal Bureau of Prisons.
 Rafter (1991b). Prison Reform Movement, 1870-1930. In Helen Tierney, (Ed.), Women Studies Encyclopedia, Vol. II (361-363). New York: Greenwood  Press.
 Rafter (1992a). Claims-making and Socio-cultural Context in the First U.S. Eugenics campaign. Social Problems 39:17-34.
 Rafter (1992b). Some Consequences of Strict Constructionism. Social  Problems 39: 38-39.
 Rafter (1994). Eugenics, Class, and the Professionalization of Social Control. In George Bridges and Martha Myers, (Eds.), Inequality and Social Control (214-227). Boulder, Colorado: Westview Press.
 Rafter (1995). International Feminist Perspectives in Criminology: Engendering a Discipline. Buckingham, UK: Open University Press.
 Rafter & Cuklanz, Lisa. (1997a). ‘Gender, Representation, and Social Control’: An Interdisciplinary Women’s Studies Course. Women and Criminal Justice. 8(4): 99-109.
 Rafter (1997b). Creating Born Criminals. Champaign, IL: University of Illinois Press.
 Rafter (1997c). Psychopathy and the Evolution of Criminological Knowledge. Theoretical Criminology I 2: 235-59.
 Rafter (1997d). The More Things Change... Women’s Review of Books XIV  10-11: 3-4.
 Rafter (1997e) The Realization of Partial Justice: A Case Study in Social Control. In James Marquart and Jonathan Sorensen, (Eds.), Contemporary and  Classical Reading (69-83). Los Angeles: Roxbury Publishing Company.
 Rafter (1997f). Transgression Obsession. Review of Ann-Louise Shapiro, Breaking the Codes: Female Criminality in Fin-de-Siècle Paris. In Women’s Review of Books XV 1:23-24.
 Rafter & Stanley, Debra. (1999). Prisons in America: A Reference Handbook. Contemporary World Issues Series.
 Rafter (2000a). Encyclopedia of Women and Crime. Phoenix AZ: Oryx Press.
 Rafter (2000b). Shots in the Mirror: Crime Films and Society. New York: Oxford University Press.
 Rafter (2001a). American Criminal Trial Films: An Overview of their Development, 1930-2000. Journal of Law and Society 28 (1): 9-25.
 Rafter (2001b). Feminism: Criminological Aspects. In Joshua Dressler (Ed.), MacMillan Encyclopedia of Crime and Justice. New York: MacMillan Reference Books.
 Rafter (2001c). National Prison Association. The Oxford Companion to United States History. New York: Oxford University Press.
 Rafter (2001d).  Seeing and Believing: Images of Heredity in Biological Theories of Crime. Brooklyn Law Review 67(1): 71-99.
 Rafter & Gibson, Mary. (2004a). Criminal Women by Cesare Lombroso Introduction. Durham, NC: Duke University Press.
 Rafter (2004b). Earnest A. Hooton and the Biological Tradition in American Criminology. Criminology 42 (3): 735-771.
 Rafter (2004c). The Criminalization of Mental Retardation. In Steven Noll and James Trend, Jr. (Eds.), Perpetual Children 232-257.
 Rafter (2004d). The Unrepentant Horse-slasher: Moral Insanity and the Origins of Criminological Thought. Criminology 42 (4): 977-1006.
 Rafter (2005). Badfellas: Movie Psychos, Popular Culture, and Law. In Michael Freeman, (Ed.), Law and Popular Culture (339-357). Oxford, England: University Press. 
 Rafter (2006). Criminal Anthropology: Its Reception in the United States and the Nature of its Appeal. In Peter Becker and Richard Wetzell, (Eds.), Criminals and Their Scientists: The History of Criminology in International Perspective. Cambridge, England: Cambridge University Press. 
 Rafter (2005). Cesare Lombroso and the Origins of Criminology: Rethinking Criminological Tradition. In Stuart Henry and Mark Lanier, The Essential Criminology Reader 33-42. Boulder, CO: Westview/Basic Books. 
 Rafter (2005). The Murderous Dutch Fiddler: Criminology, History, and the Problem of Phrenology. Theoretical Criminology 9 (1): 65-96. 
 Rafter (2006a). Apes, Men and Teeth: Earnest A. Hooton and Eugenic Decay. In Sue Currell and Christina Cogdell, (Eds.), Popular Eugenics: National Efficiency and Mass Culture in 1930. Columbus Ohio: Ohio University Press. 
 Rafter (2006b). Gender, Genes and Crimes: An Evolving Feminist Agenda. In Frances Heidensohn, (Ed.), Gender and Justice: New Concepts and Approaches (222-242). Cullompton: William Publishing. 
 Rafter (2006c). H. J. Eysenck in Fagin’s Kitchen: The Return to Biological theory in 20th-Century Criminology. History of the Human Sciences. 19(4): 37-56. 
 Rafter (2006d). Shots in the Mirror: Crime Films and Society (2nd Ed). New York, NY: Oxford University Press. 
 Rafter (2007a). Crime, Film, and Criminology: Recent Sex Crime Movies. Theoretical Criminology 11(3): 403-420. 
 Rafter (2007b). Somatotyping, Antimodernism, and the Production of Criminological Knowledge. Criminology 45(4):805-834. 
 Rafter (2008a). Criminology’s Darkest Hour: Biocriminology in Nazi Germany. The Australian and New Zealand Journal of Criminology 41(2): 287-306. 
 Rafter (2008b). The Criminal Brain: Understanding Biological Theories of Crime. New York, NY: New York University Press. 
 Rafter (2009). The Origins of Criminology: a Reader. Abingdon, Oxfordshire: Routledge.

References

1939 births
2016 deaths
American criminologists
American feminist writers
Northeastern University faculty
Harvard Graduate School of Education alumni
Swarthmore College alumni
University at Albany, SUNY alumni
American women criminologists